Ortonville State Recreation Area is a  recreation area, located in Oakland County and Lapeer County, Michigan.

Facilities
 Beach House
 Boat Launch
 Campground - 25 Equestrian Sites, 1 Cabin
 Picnic Area
 Picnic Shelter - Reservation required
 Playground
 Shooting Range

Activities
 Cross Country Skiing - 
 Fishing
 Hiking - 
 Horseback Riding - 
 Hunting
 Metal Detecting
 Mountain Biking - 
 Snow-mobiling - 
 Swimming

References

External links
Ortonville Recreation Area Michigan Department of Natural Resources

Protected areas of Oakland County, Michigan
Protected areas of Lapeer County, Michigan
State recreation areas of Michigan